Frieda Dalen (13 December 1895 – 15 February 1995) was a Norwegian teacher and organizational leader. In 1946,  she was a delegate to the first  United Nations General Assembly at London and   became the first woman to ever address the  General Assembly.

Biography
Alfrieda Kristine Jensen was born at Skedsmo in Akershus, Norway. She was the daughter of Carl Jensen (1869-1954) and Ada Emilie Andersson (1872-1957). She attended school in Kristiania (now Oslo).  In 1916 she graduated from the teachers college (Oslo lærerskole).  In 1936 she  completed a course of study at the University of Vienna. She later assisted  psychologist professor Charlotte Bühler who held a professorship at the University of Oslo (1938–40).

She was associated with Sagene School (1936–46). During the occupation of Norway by Nazi Germany she played a leading role in the teachers' civil resistance, representing teachers in the Coordination Committee of the Norwegian resistance movement. For her  resistance activities, she was arrested  with a short stay in Oslo Prison.

From 1946 until 1965,  she worked at Rosenhof skole under headmistress Anna Sethne, co-founder of the Norwegian Teacher Association (Norges Lærerinneforbund). Dalen served as chair  of the Norwegian Teacher Association 1946–55. She was also a delegate to the first  United Nations General Assembly at London in 1946, and was a member of UNESCO committees from 1946 to 1958.

Personal life
In 1939 she married Olaf Dalen (1896-1965) who was the son of  Hans Olsen Dalen (1860-1936) and Mari Johannesdatter (1867-1944).
In 1965, Frieda Dalen  was awarded the King's Medal of Merit (Kongens fortjenstmedalje) in gold. She died during 1995 and was buried at Vår Frelsers gravlund in Oslo.

References 

1895 births
1995 deaths
People from Skedsmo
Norwegian educators
Heads of schools in Norway
Norwegian resistance members
Female resistance members of World War II
Recipients of the King's Medal of Merit
Burials at the Cemetery of Our Saviour